Fiat's TwinAir engine is a Straight-twin engine designed by Fiat Powertrain Technologies as part of its Small Gasoline Engine (SGE) family — employing Fiat’s MultiAir hydraulically actuated variable valve timing and lift technology.

Offered in a variety of FCA vehicles in turbocharged and naturally aspirated variants, the engine is noted for its reduced size, weight, fuel consumption and CO2 emissions.

In the 2011 International Engine of the Year awards, the  TwinAir won Best Engine Under 1 Litre, Best New Engine, Best Green Engine and International Engine of the Year.
 Dean Slavnich, editor of Engine Technology International and co-chairman of the International Engine of the Year Awards, called the TwinAir one of the "all-time great engines.”

Development and launch 

Later, it was launched also in other FCA vehicles such as the 2012 Punto. The naturally aspirated 1.0 L  version became available on the 2012 Fiat Panda and the 500 in select markets, and so two other turbocharged 0.9 L variants: the 80 PS bi-fuel CNG/petrol unit (on Panda, 500L and Ypsilon) and the 105 PS unit (on MiTo, Punto, 500L and 500).

Applications 
 Fiat 500
 Fiat Panda
 Fiat Punto
 Fiat 500L
 Lancia Ypsilon
 Alfa Romeo MiTo
 Chrysler 200C EV (Concept)

Awards 
 Technobest 2010
 Die Besten Autos 2011:
 Paul Pietsch Prize
  International Engine of the Year 2011:
 International Engine of the Year
 Sub 1-litre class
 Best New Engine
 Best Green Engine
  International Engine of the Year 2013:
 Best Green Engine (TwinAir CNG bifuel)

References

Fiat engines
Gasoline engines by model

Straight-twin engines